Peake is a surname, and may refer to:

Archibald Peake (1859–1920), Australian conservative politician and Premier of South Australia
Arthur Peake (1865–1929), British biblical scholar
Brett Peake (born 1983), Australian rules footballer
Sir Charles Peake (1897–1958), British ambassador
Edward Peake (1860–1945), English cricketer who played international rugby for Wales
Dame Felicity Peake (1913–2002), founding director of the Women's Royal Air Force
Frederick Peake (1886–1970), British Army and police officer and creator of the Arab Legion
James Peake (born 1944), 6th United States Secretary of Veterans Affairs
Jason Peake (born 1971), English footballer
John Peake, multiple people
John Peake (field hockey) (born 1924), English field hockey player
John Peake (game designer), British board game maker
Karolína Peake (born 1975), Czech politician
Mary S. Peake (1823–1862), American teacher and humanitarian
Maxine Peake (born 1974), British actress
Mervyn Peake (1911–1968), British fantasy writer and artist
Osbert Peake, 1st Viscount Ingleby (1897–1966), British politician
Pat Peake (born 1973), American ice hockey player
Richard Brinsley Peake (1792–1847), English dramatist
Robert Peake the elder (c. 1551–1619), English painter
Sir Robert Peake (c. 1592–1667), English print-seller and royalist
Ryan Peake (born 1975), Canadian guitarist with Nickelback
Tessa Peake-Jones (born 1957), British actress
Timothy Peake (born 1972), British astronaut
William Peake (c. 1580–1639), English painter and printseller

See also
Peak (disambiguation)
Peek § People with the surname